Pelitli can refer to:

 Pelitli
 Pelitli, Bayburt
 Pelitli, Devrek
 Pelitli, Pasinler
 Pelitli, Üzümlü